Daniel Hardy or Dan Hardy may refer to:

Daniel Hardy (tight end) (born 1987), American football player
Daniel Hardy (linebacker) (born 1998), American football player
Dan Hardy (born 1982), English mixed martial artist
Daniel W. Hardy (1930–2007), Anglican theologian